Osieczyce  is a village in the administrative district of Gmina Lubniewice, part of Sulęcin County, Lubusz Voivodeship, in western Poland.

The village currently has a population of about 10.

References

Osieczyce